Megachile pexa is a species of bee in the family Megachilidae. It was described by Rebmann in 1968.

References

Pexa
Insects described in 1968